Bharpur is a village and union council, an administrative subdivision, of Chakwal District in the Punjab Province of Pakistan, it is part of Chakwal Tehsil and is located at 32°51'0N 72°34'0E

References

Union councils of Chakwal District
Populated places in Chakwal District
Villages in Kallar Kahar Tehsil